Karadzhaly (also, Kagadzhy and Kagadzhyly) is a village in the Kurdamir Rayon of Azerbaijan.

References 

Populated places in Kurdamir District